Mesorhizobium calcicola is a Gram-negative and rod-shaped bacterium from the genus of Mesorhizobium which has been isolated from the root nodules of the tree Sophora in New Zealand.

References

External links
Type strain of Mesorhizobium calcicola at BacDive -  the Bacterial Diversity Metadatabase

Phyllobacteriaceae
Bacteria described in 2016